Leonard Whiting (born 30 June 1950) is a British-born, semi-retired actor and singer best known for his teenage role as Romeo in Franco Zeffirelli's 1968 film version of Romeo and Juliet, a role which earned him the Golden Globe Award for New Star of the Year – Actor in 1969.

Early life
Whiting was born on 30 June 1950, in Wood Green, moving with his two sisters to Holloway, another area of North London, England. The only son of Peggy Joyce (O'Sullivan) and Arthur Leonard Whiting, he has English, Irish and some Romani ancestry. Whiting's love of performing was encouraged at his local Church and Primary School, St Josephs R.C Highgate, where he and sister Linda acted in the school's nativity plays. Leonard went on to attend St. Richard of Chichester School, Camden Town, leaving in 1967, before his 17th birthday, to begin work on Romeo and Juliet (1968).

Career
Whiting had some success as a child singer, almost winning Butlin's Talent Contest (he came second) hosted in the holiday camp's packed out Gaiety Theatre. Whiting was later spotted by a theatrical agent at the Connaught Rooms Holborn, where he was performing at a Jewish wedding at the age of 12. This appearance, was set up by his father to get him noticed. After hearing him sing, the agent suggested he try out for Lionel Bart's Oliver! which constantly needed replacements for its child performers. Whiting played the Artful Dodger in the long-running London musical for 15 months, and for 13 months in 1965–1966 appeared at Laurence Olivier's National Theatre in the production of William Congreve's Love for Love opposite Olivier, which toured Moscow and Berlin.

Director Franco Zeffirelli described his discovery, from 300 youngsters who had auditioned over a period of more than three months as: "He has a magnificent face, gentle melancholy, sweet, the kind of idealistic young man Romeo ought to be." Olivier did an uncredited narration in the 1968 production of Romeo and Juliet for Zeffirelli.

He played the male lead, opposite Jean Simmons in the 1971 film, Say Hello to Yesterday, a romantic comedy, filmed on location in and around London, set over one day, with him pursuing a bored housewife, twice his age storyline.

In the mid-1970s, his voice caught the attention of Abbey Road and The Dark Side of the Moon engineer Alan Parsons, who was in the process of recording what was to be the first album by the Alan Parsons Project, Tales of Mystery and Imagination. Whiting performed lead vocals on the song "The Raven" and he also narrated the introduction of the five part musical rendition of The Fall of the House of Usher on the original 1976 album, which was then replaced by Orson Welles on the 1987 remixed version.

Whiting was cast as the Pharaoh in Joseph and the Amazing Technicolor Dreamcoat in London's Westminster Theatre between 27 November 1978 and 17 January 1979. This was a Ken Hill production with the Pharaoh played by Whiting in the style of Elvis Presley.

In 1990, Whiting provided the voice of the Urpney scientist Urpgor in the children's animated television series The Dreamstone. After voicing the character for three seasons, he was replaced by Colin Marsh for the fourth and final season.

In 2014, he reunited professionally with his friend Olivia Hussey for Social Suicide (2015), their first film together in the 46 years since the Franco Zeffirelli production of  Romeo and Juliet.

Personal life
Whiting dated his teenage co-star Olivia Hussey for a time and the two have remained close. In 1971, he married US model Cathee Dahmen and in 1972, they had a daughter, Sarah Beth Whiting, who died in America in 2014 from cervical cancer. 

Following his divorce from Dahmen in 1977, Whiting had a relationship with theatre designer Valerie Marion Tobin, who gave birth to their daughter Charlotte. Charlotte has said publicly that she did not meet her father until she was 12, by which time she had taken her step-father's surname, Westenra (her mother had remarried in 1982). Charlotte Westenra became a theatre director. 

In 1995, Whiting married his assistant, Lynn Presser. Whiting ended his film career, for the most part, in the mid-1970s and subsequently focused on his theatrical career as an actor and writer. He and his wife live in Steele's Village in Haverstock, north London.

Litigation
On 30 December 2022, Whiting's lawyer filed joint legal actions with his former co-star Olivia Hussey in Los Angeles against Paramount Pictures for sexual abuse and fraud during the filming of Romeo and Juliet, when he was aged 17 (she was 16), alleging the nude scenes amounted to child abuse. The reported $100 million+ claim for punitive damages is made possible due to the temporary suspension of the statute-of-limitations laws in the  State of California for claims of historic sexual abuse allegations. 31 December 2022 was the state's absolute filing deadline for people over 40 years of age. Paramount Pictures have reportedly earned up to $500 million from the production, and Whiting, according to business manager Tony Marinozzi, wants Paramount held accountable for the mental and emotional abuse suffered over the intervening years. The third act nude sequence, it is claimed, was "secretly filmed" in September 1967 by director Franco Zeffirelli, despite the alleged objections from the two stars, who played Romeo and Juliet in the film, released in 1968. If substantiated, this would show that Whiting was aged at least 17 years and 2 months during the controversially shot scenes, making him well below the age of legal consent of 18 (as was co-star Olivia Hussey) for filming of nude scenes.

Filmography

References

External links
 

1950 births
English male film actors
English people of Irish descent
English male stage actors
Living people
People from Wood Green
20th-century English male actors
21st-century English male actors
New Star of the Year (Actor) Golden Globe winners